Cosmin Andrei Dur-Bozoancă (born 15 February 1998) is a Romanian professional footballer who plays as a goalkeeper for Oțelul Galați.

Honours
Oțelul Galați
Liga III: 2021–22

Career Statistics

Club

References

External links
 

1998 births
Living people
Sportspeople from Brașov
Romanian footballers
Association football goalkeepers
Romania youth international footballers
Romania under-21 international footballers
Liga I players
FC Viitorul Constanța players
Liga II players
SSU Politehnica Timișoara players
FC Universitatea Cluj players
FCV Farul Constanța players
Liga III players
ASC Oțelul Galați players